Nicholas Monroe and Simon Stadler were the defending champions but decided not to participate.

Andre Begemann and Lukáš Rosol won the title, defeating Peter Polansky and Adil Shamasdin in the final, 6–1, 6–2.

Seeds

  Tomasz Bednarek /  Lukáš Dlouhý (quarterfinals)
  Andre Begemann /  Lukáš Rosol (champions)
  Martin Emmrich /  Christopher Kas (first round)
  František Čermák /  Mikhail Elgin (quarterfinals)

Draw

Draw

External Links
Main Draw

UniCredit Czech Open - Doubles
2014 Doubles